Karashen is a village in the Tegh Municipality of the Syunik Province in Armenia.

Demographics 
The Statistical Committee of Armenia reported its population was 640 in 2010, up from 576 at the 2001 census.

Gallery

References 

Populated places in Syunik Province